Anson Southard Marshall (December 3, 1822 – July 4, 1874) was an American attorney and politician who served as the United States Attorney for the District of New Hampshire.

Early life and education
Marshall was born on December 3, 1822, in Lyme, New Hampshire, to Macaiah and Martha (Southard) Marshall. Marshall attended Thetford Academy in Thetford, Vermont, and graduated from Dartmouth College in 1848.

Educational career
Marshall taught school during his college vacations. From 1849 to 1851 Marshall was the principal of Fitchburg High School in Massachusetts.

Legal career
Marshall studied law with the firm of Torrey & Wood in Fitchburg, Massachusetts, and in Concord, New Hampshire, with Franklin Pierce and Josiah Minot.  Marshall was admitted to the New Hampshire Bar in 1852.

Death
On the Fourth of July, 1874, Marshall, his wife and son were setting up a picnic lunch at Penacook Lake in West Concord when his wife heard the sound of bullets over their heads. Marshall saw no one firing, shouted to the shooters to be careful, then stood up and was shot in the abdomen. Marshall died at his home later that day.  Marshall was shot with a minnie ball fired by the City Guards, a newly formed militia company that was engaged in target practice in a pasture bordering the lake.

References

1822 births
United States Attorneys for the District of New Hampshire
New Hampshire Democrats
New Hampshire lawyers
United States Department of Justice lawyers
Dartmouth College alumni
Deaths by firearm in New Hampshire
1874 deaths
People from Lyme, New Hampshire
19th-century American lawyers
Thetford Academy, Vermont alumni